Sing, but Keep Going is the first full-length record put out by Sherwood. It was released May 31, 2005. Pre-orders included autographed material by the band members. Dan Koch was the principal songwriter for the album.

Track listing
"We Do This to Ourselves" – 2:26
"Traveling Alone" – 2:54
"The Town That You Live In" – 3:25
"Lake Tahoe (For My Father)" – 2:46
"Learn to Sing" – 3:15
"I'll Wait for You" – 3:09
"Something Worth Knowing" – 3:39
"Those Bright Lights" – 2:57
"What Lucy Found There" – 1:37
"Gentleman of Promise" – 2:42
"You're Like a Ghost" – 2:50
"The Last to Know" – 2:03

References

External links
SideCho album page

2005 debut albums
Sherwood (band) albums